Faith Herbert aka Zephyr is a fictional superhero, who has appeared in various series published by Valiant Comics. Created by writer Jim Shooter and David Lapham, she is a member of the Harbinger Renegades who appear primarily in Valiant's Harbinger series, as well as a major influence in the larger Valiant Universe. 

She first appeared in Harbinger #1 (January 1992). Faith starred in her first solo limited series in April 2016 which was followed by solo ongoing series which ran from July 2016 to June 2017.

Fictional character biography
After losing her parents in a car crash at a young age, Faith Herbert was raised by her loving grandmother. The young Faith found solace in the fantasy worlds her parents had once shared with her – comic books, science-fiction movies, the TV shows of Joss Whedon, and nerd fandom filled her life. Eventually, Faith thought she had found the secret to becoming a real superhero when she was approached by the Harbinger Foundation. There Faith met Peter Stanchek, another powerful psiot the Foundation had recently recruited. Utilizing his ability to activate other latent psiots, Peter unlocked the potential within Faith, giving her the ability to fly. She is the founder of the Harbinger Resistance.

Powers and abilities
Flight, plus the ability to generate a companion field around nearby people and objects, carrying them telekinetically along her flight path. Recently she's delved into utilizing it in a psychokinetic fashion such as for shielding, a battering ram, and manipulating internal mechanisms, e.g., unlocking a door or moving people/objects around without physical contact.

Publication history 
In January 1992, Faith first appeared in Harbinger #1. Faith also appeared again in the Harbinger series after the 2012 reboot.

Solo comic series 
In 2016, Jody Houser began writing the first solo series about Faith. PBS highlighted that Faith "sold out five times in its limited-run series, a significant feat in the comic book industry" which led to Valiant launching an ongoing series starting Faith, with Houser as the writer, in July 2016. NPR's review stated that "Houser has accomplished something deceptively simple: she's made Faith a fun character to spend time with. Faith is lighthearted but virtuous, with a cheesy sense of humor, compassion and smarts". In 2017, Faith (2016) was nominated for the "Best New Series" Eisner Award.  

Houser went on to write two sequel limited series: Faith & The Future Force (2017) and Faith: Dreamside (2018). Faith also appeared in the one-shot Faith's Winter Wonderland Special #1 (December 2017) written by Marguerite Sauvage with art by Francis Portela and M.J. Kim.

Prose series 
In 2020, Faith's origin story was retold in the young adult prose novel Faith: Taking Flight by Julie Murphy. Murphy stated that "Faith doesn’t present as queer in the comics, but it didn’t feel like a leap for me to write her as queer/questioning as a young adult. First off, she’s in high school – who in high school isn’t questioning absolutely every thing? [...] So that was an aspect of Faith I was really excited to write and something I was glad to know that the team at Valiant was also open to". The sequel, Faith: Greater Heights by Murphy, was published in November 2021.

Accolades

Awards

Lists 

Faith was named one of The 16 Best Comics of 2016 by Nerdist.
Faith was named one of The 7 best new comics of 2016 by Vox.
Faith was named one of The 14 Best Comics Of 2016 by Uproxx.
Faith was named one of The 7 Best Comics & Graphic Novels of 2016 by Barnes & Noble.
The Faith #1 (ongoing series) Kevin Wada cover was the years' best cover on the Vulture list of The 10 Best Comic-Book Covers of 2016.
Faith Vol. 1: Hollywood and Vine TPB was named one of the Best of 2016 by the Everett Public Library system
Faith Vol. 1: Hollywood and Vine TPB was named one of the Best Comics & Graphics Novels of 2016 by Amazon

Collected editions

Comics

Novels

In other media 
In June 2018, Sony Pictures announced a film adaptation of Faith with Maria Melnik hired to pen the script; this was to be part of a larger series of film adaptations of the Valiant Universe. Slashfilm commented that "screenwriter Eric Heisserer seemed to indicate that Faith might pop up in the developing Harbinger before she gets her own movie". However, Sony subsequently sold the rights to the Valiant Universe to Paramount Pictures in 2019. In February 2022, Deadline reported that Wes Ball was to direct a Harbinger film written by Andrew Lanham.

References

External links 
 

Characters created by Jim Shooter
Comics characters introduced in 1992
Valiant Comics superheroes